Oklahoma Beer Act of 1933 is a United States public law legalizing the manufacture, possession, and sale of low-point beer in the State of Oklahoma. The Act of Congress cites the federal statute is binding with the cast of legal votes by the State of Oklahoma constituents or legislative action by the Oklahoma Legislature.

Abolishment of Prohibition Era
The Chapter 105 article found in volume forty-eight of the Statutes at Large was enacted into law with the Blaine Act and Cullen-Harrison Act. The beer taxation laws provided tax revenue for the relief of the 1930s financial crisis charged by the Roosevelt Administration's fiscal policy of the United States.

The 72nd United States Congress proposed the Twenty-first Amendment to the United States Constitution as endorsed by John Nance Garner and Charles Curtis on February 20, 1933. The Eighteenth Amendment to the United States Constitution or Volstead Act was repealed upon ratifying the twenty-first constitutional law abolishing Prohibition in the United States on December 5, 1933.

On August 27, 1935, the Beer, Ale, Porter, and Similar Fermented Liquor codified law sections were officially repealed with the enactment of the Liquor Law Repeal and Enforcement Act of 1935.

Oklahoma Prohibition Law of 1959
Beginning on November 10, 1958, the Oklahoma electoral precincts endorsed a referendum known as the Oklahoma Alcoholic Beverages Initiative Petition No. 264. The ballot appeal was subject for confirmation and consideration by the Governor of Oklahoma Raymond Gary prior to departing the Oklahoma Governor's office on January 12, 1959.

After approval by Oklahoma Governor Howard Edmondson and 27th Oklahoma Legislature on March 3, 1959, the state of Oklahoma convened a state-wide election regarding the wholesale and retail sales of an alcoholic drink prohibiting Oklahoma as an alcoholic beverage control state. On April 7, 1959, Oklahoma registered 711,225 cast votes repealing the Oklahoma alcohol control and prohibition law. The Oklahoma constituents decisively defeated the alcohol law by a vote of 396,845 to 314,380.

The Oklahoma election approved the distributive sales of packaged containers as original unopened alcoholic beverages merchandised by beer stores and liquor stores. The Oklahoma state statute created the Oklahoma Alcoholic Beverage Control Board ministering the alcohol beverage regulations and open container laws of Oklahoma.

Oklahoma Alcoholic Beverage Control Board and Oklahoma Court Cases

In Popular Culture
During the early 1920s, American Authors Guild recognized the flamboyant and promiscuous lifestyles of the flapper's era as the Jazz Age produced the musical and social harmony of the Roaring Twenties. American literary writers, as Ernest Hemingway and Gertrude Stein ― 27 rue de Fleurus ― defined the early twentieth century generational and social advocates as the Lost Generation of the temperance movement. 

 
By the early 1930s, the Cinema of the United States vigilantly cultivated the American charm for the dissolute social norms and the cunning Speakeasy subculture of the alcohol prohibition era.

See also

Alcohol laws of Oklahoma
Alcohol packaging warning messages
Anti-Saloon League
Association Against the Prohibition Amendment
Beer chemistry
Beer in the United States
Bible Belt
Carrie Nation
Dry county
Dry state
Dust Bowl
Great Depression
Local option
National Beer Day (United States)
New Deal
Repeal of Prohibition in the United States
United States Brewers' Association
Wickersham Commission

References

Historical Bibliography

Periodical Resources

Historical Video Archives

External links
 
 
 

1933 in law
1933 in the United States
73rd United States Congress
Prohibition in the United States
Legal history of Oklahoma